Herbert Willi (born ) is an Austrian composer of classical music, whose orchestral works, concertos and chamber music have been performed internationally and also recorded. Willi composed an opera, Schlafes Bruder, for the Opernhaus Zürich.

Life 
Willi was born in Bludenz, Vorarlberg. He studied music pedagogy and theology at the University of Innsbruck, and simultaneously bassoon and piano at the Innsbruck conservatory. From 1983, he studied composition with Helmut Eder at the Salzburg Mozarteum, then with Boguslaw Schaeffer. He lives in Sankt Anton im Montafon.

Work 

Willi's work comprises an opera, orchestral works, and chamber music, including compositions for one player. Willi received a commission from the Salzburg Festival and the Cleveland Orchestra in 1991 for Konzert für Orchester. The premiere was conducted by Christoph von Dohnányi. In 1994/95, the Opernhaus Zürich commissioned the opera Schlafes Bruder on the occasion of Austria's millennial, with a libretto by Robert Schneider, who had written the novel on which it is based, Schlafes Bruder. It was premiered in 1996. In 1997/98, Willi composed Begegnung für Orchester on a commission by the Wiener Philharmoniker for the orchestra's 150th anniversary.

He composed Montafon, a concerto cycle containing the works Eirene, a trumpet concerto; ...geraume Zeit..., a concerto for flute, oboe and orchestra; ego eimi, a clarinet concerto; and Äon, a horn concerto. A revised version of Schlafes Bruder was produced at the Stadttheater Klagenfurt in March 2008.

Willi's works were performed in Carnegie Hall in New York City, Tokyo, the Royal Albert Hall in London, and at the Philharmonie Berlin, among others. They were played by the Berlin Philharmonic, Wiener Philharmoniker, Cleveland Orchestra, Philadelphia Orchestra, Pittsburgh Symphony Orchestra and New Japan Philharmonic, conducted by Claudio Abbado, Gustavo Dudamel, Manfred Honeck, Riccardo Muti and Seiji Ozawa.

His works were recorded: the WERGO label published orchestral works including Eirene, Räume, Rondino after his opera Schlafes Bruder, geraume Zeit and Begegnung, and the Japanese label Camerata Tokyo released a CD with chamber music from 1984 to 2005.

Awards 
Willi received scholarships and awards, and was composer in residence: 
 1985, 1989: Austrian state scholarship for composers
 1987: Prize at the competition for string quartets of the Wiener Konzerthausgesellschaft (for his Streichquartett 1986 premiered by the Arditti Quartet)
 1989: 
 1990: Rolf-Liebermann-Stipendium für Opernkompositionen
 1991: Ernst von Siemens Composers' Prize
 1997: Österreichisches Ehrenzeichen für Wissenschaft und Kunst
 1998: Großes Verdienstzeichen des Landes Vorarlberg
 1992: Composer in residence at the Salzburg Festival
 1996–1998: Composer in residence with the Camerata Academia
 2002/2003: Composer in residence with the Gesellschaft der Musikfreunde of the Wiener Musikverein and the Wiener Concert-Verein
 2007: Composer in residence at the Pacific Music Festival in Sapporo
 2008: Composer in residence at the International Summer Music Academy & Festival in Kusatsu

Works 

Stage 
Schlafes Bruder, opera in a prologue, eight scenes and an epilogue (1994–1996, rev. 2006)

Orchestral and concertante 
Der Froschmäusekrieg (UA 1989) after the epic
Für 16, small chamber concerto (1990)
Konzert (1991/92)
Flötenkonzert (1993)
Begegnung (1997/98)
Rondino (1999/2000)
Eirene, trumpet concerto (2001)
...geraume Zeit..., concerto for flute, oboe and orchestra (2002/03)
ego eimi, clarinet concerto (2005/06)
Äon, horn concerto (2007)
ABBA-MA (Echo of Peace), for choir and orchestra – German text based on the Lord's Prayer (2011)
Sacrosanto, violin concerto (2011/12)

Chamber music 
Stück for clarinet solo (1985), premiered by Alois Brandhofer
Stück for flute solo (1985/86)
Trio for violin, horn and piano (1992)
Kairos im Kronos 1756/1956 for violin, viola and cello (2005)

References

External links 
 
  (TV portrait)
 
 

Austrian male classical composers
20th-century classical composers
Recipients of the Austrian Decoration for Science and Art
Ernst von Siemens Composers' Prize winners
University of Innsbruck alumni
Mozarteum University Salzburg alumni
Living people
1956 births
People from Bludenz
20th-century male musicians